is a station in Hamada, Shimane Prefecture, Japan.

Lines
 West Japan Railway Company (JR West)
 San'in Main Line

Layout
The station has a side platform, an island platform, and three tracks.

Adjacent stations
West Japan Railway Company (JR West)

Railway stations in Japan opened in 1922
Railway stations in Shimane Prefecture
Sanin Main Line